The Apollo Hall Democracy was a reform movement founded within the Democratic Party of the City and State of New York in the early 1870s as a response to the corruption of Tammany Hall under Boss Tweed. Hirsch (1951) describes the "Apollo Democracy founded in 1870 by a zealous band of reformers meeting at Apollo Hall, Broadway at 28th Street" as the nucleus of the Democratic Reform Committee formed in the wake of the Tammany Hall-dominated state Democratic convention of 1871. 

Oswald Ottendorfer & Abraham R. Lawrence, both ejected from the convention, were among the founders of the movement. The Committee also absorbed the Young Democracy movement founded by James O'Brien and came to be called the Apollo Hall Democracy. It initially attracted many leading Democrats, including Charles O'Conor & Samuel J. Tilden, but was unable to supplant Tammany Hall, which became reinvigorated under the leadership of John Kelly after the fall of Boss Tweed.  Since the Apollo Hall Democracy nominated its own sets of candidates, the Democratic vote during its floruit was split, allowing the Republicans to win many elections in New York during this brief period.  By the mid-1870s, many frustrated members of the Apollo Hall Democracy such as its former chairman William H. Wickham and William Collins Whitney joined Tammany Hall, and the Apollo movement fell into irrelevance.

References

Organizations based in New York City